Mount Elliott may refer to:

 Mount Elliott (Antarctica)
 Mount Elliott (British Columbia)
 Mount Elliott (Queensland)
 Mount Elliott Tool and Die
 Mount Elliott (Utah), a butte in Emory County, Utah

See also
 Mount Elliot (disambiguation)